Mirage Aircraft Corporation is an American aircraft manufacturer based in Prescott Valley, Arizona. The company specializes in the provision of homebuilt aircraft plans for amateur construction.

The company markets plans for the Mirage Celerity that was designed by Larry Burton and first flown in 1985. Burton died suddenly of a heart attack in 1994 and Mirage Aircraft continued the sale of his aircraft design. Kits for the Celerity and the fixed gear Mirage Marathon variant are provided by Aircraft Spruce & Specialty Co.

The company was originally located in Tucson, Arizona and later relocated to Prescott Valley, Arizona.

Aircraft

References

External links

Aircraft manufacturers of the United States
Homebuilt aircraft
Manufacturing companies based in Arizona